The Namyang Jegal clan was a Korean clan (bon-gwan). Their clan was in Henan, China. According to research in 2000, the members the of Namyang Jegal clan numbered 4374. Jegal clan was born in Henan, China. Namyang Jegal clan’s founder was  who served as a Taesangunseung at the end of Han dynasty.

See also 
 Korean clan names of foreign origin

References

External links 
 

 
Korean clan names of Chinese origin